Flight 240 may refer to:

Malév Flight 240, crashed on 30 September 1975
Dan-Air Flight 240, crashed on 26 June 1981

0240